Jolof ( or ) may refer to either of
 Jolof Empire, a West African successor state to the Mali Empire in modern Senegal from the 14th to 16th centuries
 Kingdom of Jolof, a rump survival of the earlier empire from the 16th to the 19th centuries

See also
 Jollof rice